The Emile Seriser Bridge is a low-level, four-lane road bridge which crosses the Macquarie River in Dubbo, New South Wales, Australia. The bridge carries the Newell Highway, a major freight corridor, and along with the LH Ford Bridge on the Mitchell Highway makes Dubbo a major freight hub.

The bridge is prone to flooding, being only 257.6 metres on the Australian Height Datum and lower than the 1-in-10-year recurrence interval flood level of 259.97 metres AHD for the Macquarie River at Dubbo. When the bridge is closed due to flooding, traffic is diverted to the two-lane LH Ford Bridge, which can result in congestion and long travel delays due to capacity issues.

References

Road bridges in New South Wales
Dubbo
Newell Highway